Aghore Debbarma is an Indian politician and a former Agriculture minister of the Tripura state.

As a member of the Communist Party of India (Marxist) (CPI-M), he represented Asharambari Vidhan Sabha constituency of Khowai district. He served as a minister of Tripura for Agriculture, Tribal Welfare, Animal resources. He is also a central committee member of CPI-M and Leader of GMP, the tribal wing of CPI-M. In 2018, he lost the Legislative Assembly election to Mevar Kumar Jamatiya of Indigenous People's Front of Tripura (IPFT).

Political career 
In 1985 Debbarma was elected as Chief Executive Member of Tripura Tribal Areas Autonomous District Council. He was again elected to the same post in 2005. He was also a cabinet minister of Tribal Welfare, Agriculture & Animal Resource Development from 2008 to 2018.

Awards 
He was awarded the Krishi Karman Award 2015-16 by the Government of India.

References 

Tripura politicians
Living people
Communist Party of India (Marxist) politicians
Communist Party of India (Marxist) politicians from Tripura
1951 births